PB Max was a candy bar made in the United States by Mars, launched in 1989 or 1990.  They were made of creamy peanut butter  on top of a square-shaped whole grain cookie, enrobed in milk chocolate.

The peanut butter in PB Max was sweetened with sugar and combined with hydrogenated vegetable oil to prevent separation. The label's serving suggestion was "1 piece" weighing 42 g, containing 240 calories, 5 g protein, 20 g carbohydrates, 16 g fat, and 150 mg sodium.

Early television commercials for PB Max declared that the "PB" in its name didn't stand for things such as piggy banks, polka band, portly ballerina, platinum blonde, penguin black-belt, pig basketball, plow boy, pure bliss, parachuting buffalo, or pink baboon — but that it in fact stood for peanut butter.

According to former Mars executive Alfred Poe, PB Max was discontinued due to the Mars family's distaste for peanut butter, despite $50 million in sales.

Ingredients 

Peanut butter (peanuts, sugar, hydrogenated vegetable oil, salt), milk chocolate (sugar, cocoa butter, milk, chocolate, soy lecithin, vanillin), partially hydrogenated vegetable oil (canola, soybean and cottonseed), oats, flour, sugar, mono and diglycerides, baking soda, high fructose corn syrup, TBHQ.

See also
 List of peanut dishes

References 

Chocolate bars
Mars confectionery brands
Products introduced in 1990
Discontinued products